Bob Warn is a former Indiana State Sycamores baseball coach. While coaching Indiana State University's Baseball team, he led the Sycamores to six Missouri Valley Conference (1979, 1983, 1984, 1986, 1989, 1995) championships, seven NCAA Tournament (1979, 1983, 1984, 1986, 1987, 1989, 1995) appearances, and a College World Series (1986) appearance while compiling a record of 1,079-745-9 (.591).  Five of his teams finished the season ranked in the Top 30 in the country (1979, 1983, 1984, 1986 and 1989) In 2000, he was inducted into the Indiana Baseball Hall of Fame. In 2009, the Indiana State Sycamores baseball field was named Bob Warn Field in his honor.

Seventeen of Warn's players went on to play in the major leagues, including Zane Smith, Wallace Johnson, Clint Barmes and Joe Thatcher.  He was named MVC Coach of the Year thrice; 1979, 1983 & 1984.

Warn's Indiana State teams featured 16 All-Americans and 60 All-Conference (First Team) players, while his Iowa Western teams placed two players on the JUCO All-American rolls.

Head coaching record

References

Living people
Eastern Illinois Panthers baseball coaches
Indiana State Sycamores baseball coaches
Iowa Western Reivers baseball coaches
Southern Illinois Salukis baseball players
Western Illinois Leathernecks baseball coaches
Year of birth missing (living people)